Henrike Hahn (born 4 September 1970) is a German politician who has been a Member of the European Parliament since July 2019. She is a member of Alliance 90/The Greens (German: Bündnis 90/Die Grünen or Grüne) at national level, and sits with the Group of the Greens/European Free Alliance in the European Parliament.

Academic career 
Hahn is a political scientist, having studied at Sorbonne-Nouvelle in Paris, University of Michigan in Ann Arbor, Wayne State University in Detroit, and Ludwig Maximilian University of Munich.

Early career 
For many years, Hahn worked as a consultant for technology-oriented companies, with a focus on strategy consulting, market research, and competitive analysis in Paris and Munich. From 2010 to 2015, she worked for a member of the Bavarian State Parliament. In 2017, she worked as research associate at the German Bundestag. She also worked as a researcher on Europe and Transatlantic relations at the Centre for Applied Policy Research (CAP) at Ludwig Maximilian University of Munich (LMU); as visiting researcher at the American Institute for Contemporary German Studies (AICGS); and in the research team on European integration at the German Institute for International and Security Affairs (SWP).

Political career
Hahn has been an active member the Bavarian Greens since 2012, having also served as the spokeswoman for the state working group for economy and finance. She has worked as an assessor for the Bavarian Greens, and has been a member of the national executive committee of Alliance 90/The Greens since October 2017. She previously ran for election to the European Parliament in 2014.

Since the 2019 European elections, Hahn has been a Member of the European Parliament. She has since been serving on the Committee on Industry, Research and Energy. In addition to her committee assignments, she is part of the Parliament’s delegations for relations with China and the United States.

Other activities
Hahn is a member of Amnesty International, the German Alpine Club, the German Federation for the Environment and Nature Conservation (Friends of the Earth Germany), and Greenpeace.

Personal life 
Hahn was born in Munich, and grew up in Oberpframmern. She currently lives in Munich-Neuhausen with her two daughters.

References 

1970 births
Living people
Alliance 90/The Greens MEPs
University of Paris alumni
University of Michigan alumni
Wayne State University alumni
Ludwig Maximilian University of Munich alumni
Politicians from Munich
German expatriates in the United States
German expatriates in France
Women members of State Parliaments in Germany
German political scientists
Women political scientists
MEPs for Germany 2019–2024
21st-century women MEPs for Germany